The Yarns of Billy Borker is a 1964 Australian TV series for the ABC based on scripts by Frank Hardy.  They consisted of five-minute episodes of stories written by Hardy and told by Peter Carver. It was shot in Perth.

Hardy later turned these into a book and an album.

The show was replaced with another similar one called Under the Morning Star.

References

External links
Yanks of Billy Borker at TV Memories

1964 Australian television series debuts
1960s Australian comedy television series
1970s Australian comedy television series
1980s Australian comedy television series
1990s Australian comedy television series
2000s Australian comedy television series
2010s Australian comedy television series
2020s Australian comedy television series